The UEFA Euro 2016 qualifying Group C was one of the nine groups to decide which teams would qualify for the UEFA Euro 2016 finals tournament. Group C consisted of six teams: Spain, Ukraine, Slovakia, Belarus, Macedonia, and Luxembourg, where they played against each other home-and-away in a round-robin format.

Originally Gibraltar had been drawn in this group, but were moved to group D due to Spain not being willing to play them because of the disputed status of Gibraltar.

The top two teams, Spain and Slovakia, qualified directly for the finals. As third-placed Ukraine weren't the highest-ranked among all third-placed teams, they advanced to the play-offs, where they won against Slovenia and thus qualified as well.

Standings

Matches 

The fixtures were released by UEFA the same day as the draw, which was held on 23 February 2014 in Nice. Times are CET/CEST, as listed by UEFA (local times are in parentheses).

Goalscorers

Discipline 
A player was automatically suspended for the next match for the following offences:
 Receiving a red card (red card suspensions could be extended for serious offences)
 Receiving three yellow cards in three different matches, as well as after fifth and any subsequent yellow card (yellow card suspensions were carried forward to the play-offs, but not the finals or any other future international matches)
The following suspensions were served during the qualifying matches:

Notes

References

External links 

UEFA Euro 2016 qualifying round Group C

Group C
2014–15 in Spanish football
Qual
2014–15 in Slovak football
Q
2014 in Belarusian football
2015 in Belarusian football
2014–15 in Ukrainian football
Q
2014–15 in Luxembourgian football
2015–16 in Luxembourgian football
2014–15 in Republic of Macedonia football
2015–16 in Republic of Macedonia football